Andrei B. Severny (Северный, Андрей Борисович; 1913–1987) was a Soviet astronomer, particularly known for his work on solar flares and astronomical observations from artificial satellites. He was director of the Crimean Astrophysical Observatory from 1952–1987 and vice-president of the International Astronomical Union from 1964 to 1970.

After World War II, he was assigned to the Crimean Observatory, which was originally based in Simeiz, Crimea, on the Black Sea coast, and was then involved in the construction of a new observer in Naucine, in the Crimean Mountains.

Awards
Severny received the title Hero of Socialist Labor in 1973.

References
 Obituary -- "Andrei B. Severny, 73, Top Soviet Astronomer." The New York Times, April 21, 1987. 
 Keith Davies - Evidence for a Young Sun 
 Severny, A.B., Kotov, V.A., and Tsap, T.T., 1976. "Observations of solar pulsations," Nature, vol. 259, p. 89.

1913 births
1987 deaths
Soviet astronomers
Full Members of the USSR Academy of Sciences